Warrenville may refer to the following places in the United States:

Warrenville, Illinois
Warrenville, South Carolina
Warrenville, a populated place and road in Warren Township, New Jersey

References